Euphorbia clavarioides is a species of herbaceous plant in the family Euphorbiaceae. It is native to Botswana, Lesotho, and South Africa. It may grow to 18 cm in diameter, with a height of 30 cm. Its flowers are yellow.

References

Sources
 Cent. Euphorb. 25 1860.
 The Plant List
 Birhmann's Caudiciforms

clavarioides
Taxa named by Pierre Edmond Boissier